Aleuritopteris is a genus of ferns in the Cheilanthoideae subfamily of the Pteridaceae. As with some other genera of the Cheilanthoideae, molecular phylogenetic studies have suggested that it is not monophyletic, and so may need to be circumscribed differently in future.

Taxonomy
Aleuritopteris is one of a number of genera split off from Cheilanthes in some approaches, including the Pteridophyte Phylogeny Group classification of 2016 (PPG I), in which the genus has about 40 species. , Plants of the World Online includes Aleuritopteris within Hermionitis, a much smaller Cheilanthoideae genus in PPG I. Allosorus was recognized as a separate genus in PPG I, but was included in Aleuritopteris by the Checklist of Ferns and Lycophytes of the World  on the grounds that it was wrongly lectotypified.

Species
, the Checklist of Ferns and Lycophytes of the World recognized the following species and hybrids:

Aleuritopteris agetae Saiki
Aleuritopteris albofusca (Baker) Pic. Serm.
Aleuritopteris albomarginata (C.B.Clarke) Ching
Aleuritopteris anceps (Blanf.) Panigrahi
Aleuritopteris argentea (S.G.Gmel.) Fée
Aleuritopteris aurantiaca (Cav.) Ching
Aleuritopteris belensis (Weath. ex Copel.) H.Schneid.
Aleuritopteris bicolor (Roxb.) Fraser-Jenk.
Aleuritopteris bullosa (Kunze) Ching
Aleuritopteris chrysophylla (Hook.) Ching
Aleuritopteris × confundans Fraser-Jenk.
Aleuritopteris dealbata (C.Presl) Fée
Aleuritopteris dubia (Hope) Ching
Aleuritopteris duclouxii (Christ) Ching
Aleuritopteris duthiei (Baker) Ching
Aleuritopteris ebenipes X.C.Zhang
Aleuritopteris farinosa (Forsk.) Fée
Aleuritopteris formosana (Hayata) Tagawa
Aleuritopteris × fraser-jenkinsii (Thapa) Fraser-Jenk. & Khullar
Aleuritopteris × gardneri Fraser-Jenk.
Aleuritopteris × godavariensis Fraser-Jenk. & Khullar
Aleuritopteris gongshanensis G.M.Zhang
Aleuritopteris grevilleoides (Christ) G.M.Zhang & X.C.Zhang
Aleuritopteris grisea (Blanf.) Panigrahi
Aleuritopteris × hamiltonii Fraser-Jenk.
Aleuritopteris × khasiana Fraser-Jenk.
Aleuritopteris krameri (Franch. & Sav.) Ching
Aleuritopteris leptolepis (Fraser-Jenk.) Fraser-Jenk.
Aleuritopteris × nepalensis Fraser-Jenk.
Aleuritopteris niphobola (C.Chr.) Ching
Aleuritopteris × pangteyi Fraser-Jenk. & E.Wollenw.
Aleuritopteris papuana (C.Chr.) H.Schneid.
Aleuritopteris parishii Fraser-Jenk.
Aleuritopteris pygmaea Ching
Aleuritopteris rosulata (C.Chr.) Ching
Aleuritopteris rouxii Fraser-Jenk. & E.Wollenw.
Aleuritopteris rufa (D.Don) Ching
Aleuritopteris scioana (Chiov.) Fraser-Jenk. & Dulawat
Aleuritopteris siamensis S.K.Wu
Aleuritopteris sichouensis Ching & S.K.Wu
Aleuritopteris speciosa Ching & S.K.Wu
Aleuritopteris squamosa (Hope & Wright) Ching
Aleuritopteris stenochlamys Ching
Aleuritopteris subargentea Ching ex S.K.Wu
Aleuritopteris subdimorpha (C.B.Clarke & Baker) Fraser-Jenk.
Aleuritopteris tamburii (Hook.) Ching
Aleuritopteris × unicolor Fraser-Jenk. & Khullar
Aleuritopteris veitchii (Christ) Ching
Aleuritopteris × vermae (Fraser-Jenk. & Viane) Fraser-Jenk. & Khullar
Aleuritopteris × wallichiana Fraser-Jenk.
Aleuritopteris welwitschii (Hook. ex Baker) Ching
Aleuritopteris wollenweberi Fraser-Jenk.
Aleuritopteris yalungensis H.S.Kung

References

 
Fern genera
Taxonomy articles created by Polbot
Taxa named by Antoine Laurent Apollinaire Fée